2003 was designated the International Year of the Fresh water.

In 2003, a United States-led coalition invaded Iraq, beginning the Iraq War.

Events

January
 January 5 – Tel Aviv central bus station: Two Palestinian suicide bombers attack a neighborhood in Tel Aviv, killing at least 23 people and injuring 103.
 January 8 – Air Midwest Flight 5481 crashed into a hanger upon takeoff in Charlotte, North Carolina, killing all 21 passengers and crew.
 January 10 – North Korea announces its withdrawal from the Treaty on the Non-Proliferation of Nuclear Weapons.
 January 22 
 The last signal from NASA's Pioneer 10 spacecraft is received, some 12.2 billion kilometers (7.6 billion mi) from Earth.
 A 7.6-magnitude earthquake strikes the state of Colima in southwestern Mexico, killing at least 29.
 January 29 – Riots break out in Phnom Penh, Cambodia targeting Thai nationals after false reports that a Thai actress made comments about a temple. Thailand severs diplomatic relations with Cambodia in response.

February
 February 1 – At the conclusion of the STS-107 mission, the Space Shuttle Columbia disintegrates during reentry over Texas, killing all seven astronauts on board.
 February 4 – The Federal Republic of Yugoslavia is renamed to "Serbia and Montenegro" (after its two constituent states) after its leaders reconstitute the country into a loose state-union between Montenegro and Serbia, marking an end to the 73-year-long use of the name "Yugoslavia" by a sovereign state.
 February 5 – U.S. Secretary of State Colin Powell speaks to the United Nations presenting the case for a military invasion of Iraq. It will later be discovered that the Bush administration misled him when preparing his testimony.
 February 7 – 2003 El Nogal Club bombing: A car bomb goes off in the garage of the El Nogal club in Bogotá, Colombia, killing 36 people and injuring hundreds.
 February 15–16 – Antwerp diamond heist: An Italian gang steals loose diamonds, gold and jewellery valued at more than $100 million from a Belgian vault, one of the largest robberies in history.
 February 15 – Millions of people worldwide take part in massive anti-war protests in anticipation of the United States and its allies invading Iraq to overthrow Saddam Hussein's regime.
 February 18 – An arsonist sets fire to a subway train in Daegu, South Korea, killing 192 people.
 February 19 – An Ilyushin Il-76 plane crashes near Kerman Airport in Iran, killing 270 military personnel.
 February 20 – A pyrotechnics accident during a Great White concert causes a fire at a nightclub in West Warwick, Rhode Island, killing 100 people.
 February 24 – 2003 Bachu earthquake: A 6.8 earthquake strikes in Xinjiang, killing 257 people.
 February 26 – The War in Darfur begins after rebel groups rise up against the Sudanese government.
 February 27 – Former Bosnian Serb leader Biljana Plavšić is sentenced by the United Nations International Criminal Tribunal for the former Yugoslavia to 11 years in prison for war crimes committed during the Bosnian War.

March
 March 8 – Malta approves joining the European Union in a referendum.
 March 12
 Serbian Prime Minister Zoran Đinđić is assassinated in Belgrade by a sniper.
 The World Health Organization issues a global alert on severe acute respiratory syndrome when it spreads to Hong Kong and Vietnam after originating in Mainland China.
 March 15 – Former General François Bozizé seizes power through a military coup in the Central African Republic.
 March 17 – U.S. President George W. Bush presents a 48 hour ultimatum for Iraqi president Saddam Hussein to resign.
 March 20 – The Iraq War begins with the invasion of Iraq by the U.S. and allied forces.
 March 23
 2003 Nadimarg massacre: Islamist militants gather and execute citizens of a Hindu village in Kashmir, killing 24 of the 54 residents.
 Slovenia approves joining the European Union and NATO in a referendum.

April
 April 9 – U.S. forces seize control of Baghdad, ending the rule of Saddam Hussein.
 April 12 – Hungary approves joining the European Union in a referendum.
 April 14 – The Human Genome Project is completed, with 99% of the human genome sequenced to 99.99% accuracy.
 April 16 – The Treaty of Accession is signed in Athens between the European Union and ten countries (Czech Republic, Estonia, Cyprus, Latvia, Lithuania, Hungary, Malta, Poland, Slovenia and Slovakia), concerning these countries' accession into the EU, leading to the 2004 enlargement of the European Union.
 April 27 – Nicanor Duarte Frutos is elected president over Julio César Franco in the 2003 Paraguayan general election.
 April 29 – The United States announces the withdrawal of its troops stationed in Saudi Arabia, and the redeployment of some at the Al Udeid Air Base in Qatar.

May
 May 1
 2003 Bingöl earthquake: A 6.4  earthquake strikes in Bingöl, Turkey, killing 177 people.
 U.S. President George W. Bush declares an end to the invasion of Iraq in the Mission Accomplished speech. Hostilities would continue for several years during a period of Iraqi insurgency.
 May 11
 Benvenuto Cellini's Cellini Salt Cellar table sculpture is stolen from the Kunsthistorisches Museum in Vienna.
 Lithuania approves joining the European Union in a referendum.
 2003 Sri Lanka cyclone: A cyclone makes landfall in Sri Lanka, killing 260 people and causing the country's worst natural disaster in 50 years.
 May 12
 In Riyadh, Saudi Arabia, over 30 people are killed in multiple bombings at a housing compound, mostly foreign expatriates.
 2003 Znamenskoye suicide bombing: Chechen suicide bombers attack a government office in Znamenskoye, Russia, killing at least 59 people.
 May 15 – 2003 Argentine general election: Néstor Kirchner becomes president-elect of Argentina after Carlos Menem withdraws from the runoff election.
 May 16 – 2003 Casablanca bombings: Islamist militants affiliated with Al-Qaeda in the Islamic Maghreb carry out a series of suicide bombings in Casablanca, Morocco, killing at least 41 people.
 May 17 – Slovakia approves joining the European Union in a referendum.
 May 21 – Algeria The 6.8  Boumerdès earthquake shakes the suburb of the Algerian capital Algiers with a maximum Mercalli intensity of X (Violent), killing an estimated 2,266 people.
 May 23 – Dewey, the world's first cloned deer is born, at Texas A&M University.
 May 26 – A constitutional referendum is held in Rwanda.
 May 28 – Prometea, the world's first cloned horse, is born.

June
 June 2 – Mars Express launches, containing the Beagle 2 lander.
 June 8
 Poland approves joining the European Union in a referendum.
 Major Saleh Ould Hanenna leads a failed coup in Mauritania, leading to violence.
 June 14 – The Czech Republic approves joining the European Union in a referendum.
 June 15 – Operation Desert Scorpion: U.S. forces in Iraq facilitate searches for Ba'athist forces, distribution of humanitarian aid, and engineering programs to repair damaged infrastructure.
 June 21 – Declaration of Thessaloniki: The European Union encourages accession of states of the western Balkans.
 June 30 – Warring parties in the Democratic Republic of the Congo sign a peace accord, bringing an end to the Second Congo War, which left millions dead.

July
 July–August – 2003 European heat wave: Europe experiences its hottest summer in over five centuries.
 July 1 – Tesla Inc., the American electric car company, is founded by Martin Eberhard and Marc Tarpenning in San Carlos, California.
 July 2 – The International Olympic Committee awards Vancouver the right to host the 2010 Winter Olympics.
 July 4 – 2003 Quetta mosque bombing: Islamist militants attack a Shia mosque in Quetta, Pakistan, killing at least 44 people.
 July 5 – Severe acute respiratory syndrome is declared to be contained by the World Health Organization.
 July 6
 The 70-meter Eupatoria Planetary Radar sends a METI message Cosmic Call 2 to five stars: Hip 4872, HD 245409, 55 Cancri, HD 10307 and 47 Ursae Majoris, that will arrive at these stars in 2036, 2040, May 2044, September 2044 and 2049 respectively.
 Dennis Schmitt discovers the island of 83-42, a candidate for being the northernmost point of land.
 July 10 – The existence of PSR B1620−26 b, the oldest known exoplanet in the galaxy, is confirmed using observations from the Hubble Space Telescope.
 July 13 – The Iraqi Governing Council is created by the United States as an ethnically diverse provisional government of Iraq.
 July 14 – Robert Novak identifies Valerie Plame as a covert CIA agent, initiating a scandal known as the Plame affair.
 July 16 – Major Fernando Pereira leads a failed coup in São Tomé and Príncipe.
 July 18 – The Convention on the Future of Europe finishes its work and proposes the first European Constitution.
 July 24 – The Regional Assistance Mission to the Solomon Islands, led by Australia, begins after ethnic violence engulfs the island country.
 July 27 – Oakwood mutiny: Philippine military officers lead approximately 300 soldiers a failed coup.

August
 August 1 – Social networking service Myspace is launched.
 August 11
 The Second Liberian Civil War comes to an end after President Charles Taylor resigns and flees the country.
 NATO takes over command of the peacekeeping force in Afghanistan, marking its first major operation outside Europe in its 54-year-history.
 August 14 – The Northeast blackout of 2003 cuts electricity to the northeastern United States and parts of Canada.
 August 19
 In the Canal Hotel bombing in Baghdad 22 people are killed, among them United Nations' Special Representative in Iraq Sérgio Vieira de Mello.
 Shmuel HaNavi bus bombing: A Palestinian suicide bomber kills at least 18 people in a bus bombing in Jerusalem.
 August 25
The Spitzer Space Telescope is launched from Cape Canaveral, Florida.
Car bombs explode at Gateway of India and Zaveri Bazaar in Mumbai, claiming 54 lives and injuring 244 others. Pakistan-based Lashkar-e-Taiba is blamed for the attack.
 August 27
Mars makes its closest approach to Earth in over 60,000 years.
 The first six-party talks, involving South and North Korea, the United States, China, Japan and Russia, convene to find a peaceful resolution to the security concerns of the North Korean nuclear weapons program.
 August 29 – Imam Ali mosque bombing: A bomb kills at least 125 people, including Mohammad Baqir al-Hakim, at a Shia mosque in Najaf, Iraq.

September
 September 12 – Typhoon Maemi, the strongest recorded typhoon to strike South Korea, made landfall near Busan.
 September 14
 General Veríssimo Correia Seabra leads a bloodless coup in Guinea-Bissau. He steps down to create a new civilian government days later.
 Estonia approves joining the European Union in a referendum.
 September 15 – ELN rebels kidnap eight foreign tourists at Ciudad Perdida, Colombia, being freed 100 days later following negotiations with the Colombian government.
 September 20 – Latvia approves joining the European Union in a referendum.
 September 24 – The Hubble Space Telescope starts the Hubble Ultra-Deep Field, making 800 exposures, until January 16, 2004.
 September 27 – SMART-1, an ESA spaceprobe and ESA's first mission to the moon, is launched from Kourou, French Guiana.
 September 28 – 2003 Italy blackout: Power goes out across the Italian Peninsula for approximately 12 hours, affecting nearly all of the country's 57 million people.

October
 October 1 – The popular and controversial English-language imageboard 4chan is launched.
 October 4 – Maxim restaurant suicide bombing: A Palestinian suicide bomber attacks a restaurant in Haifa, Israel, killing at least 19 people.
 October 5 – Israeli warplanes strike alleged Islamic jihad bases inside Syrian territory, the first Israeli attack on the country since the 1973 Yom Kippur War.
 October 15 – China launches Shenzhou 5, their first human spaceflight.
 October 24 – Concorde makes its last commercial flight, bringing the era of airliner supersonic travel to an end.
 October 27 – 27 October 2003 Baghdad bombings: A series of car bombings occur in Baghdad, Iraq, targeting multiple police stations and a Red Cross headquarters. Approximately 40 people are killed.
 October 31 – Mahathir Mohamad steps down as Prime Minister of Malaysia after 22 years in power. He is succeeded by Abdullah Ahmad Badawi.

November
 November 12 – A suicide bombing at an Italian military police headquarters in Nasiriyah, Iraq, kills 17 Italian military police officers and nine Iraqi civilians.
 November 23 – Georgian President Eduard Shevardnadze resigns after widespread protests engulf the country following a disputed parliamentary election.
 November 26 – The supersonic passenger jet, Concorde, makes its last ever flight from Heathrow Airport in London to Bristol Filton Airport.

December
 December 5 – 2003 Stavropol train bombing: A suicide bomber attacks a train in Stavropol Krai, killing 46 people.
 December 12 – Paul Martin becomes the 21st Prime Minister of Canada.
 December 13 – Saddam Hussein, the former president of Iraq, is captured in the small town of Ad-Dawr by the U.S. Army.
 December 19
 Libya agrees to eliminate all of its materials, equipment, and programs aimed at producing weapons of mass destruction.
 The Beagle 2 Mars lander deploys, but contact is lost.
 December 23 
 The World Tourism Organization becomes a specialized agency of the United Nations.
 PetroChina Chuandongbei natural gas field explosion, Guoqiao, Kai County, Chongqing, China, killing at least 234.
 December 26 – The 6.6  Bam earthquake shakes southeastern Iran with a maximum Mercalli intensity of IX (Violent), killing an estimated 30,000 people.
 December 29 – The last known speaker of the Akkala Sámi language dies, rendering it extinct.

Births and Deaths

Nobel Prizes

 Chemistry – Peter Agre, Roderick MacKinnon
 Economics – Robert F. Engle, Sir Clive Granger
 Literature – J. M. Coetzee
 Peace – Shirin Ebadi
 Physics – Alexei Abrikosov, Vitaly Ginzburg, Sir Anthony James Leggett
 Physiology or Medicine – Paul Lauterbur, Sir Peter Mansfield

New English words and terms
anti-cultural
baby bump
Big Rip
binge-watch
botnet
darmstadtium
electronic cigarette
flash mob
iraimbilanja
manscaping
MERS
muffin top
netroots
SARS
severe acute respiratory syndrome
unfriend

References

External links

 
 2003 Year in Review – comprehensive listing of 2003 reviews and lists
 2003 Year-End Google Zeitgeist – Google's Yearly List of Major Events and Top Searches for 2003